Paulinho da Costa (born Paulo Roberto da Costa on May 31, 1948) is a Brazilian percussionist born in Rio de Janeiro, considered one of the most recorded musicians of modern times. Beginning his career as a samba musician in Brazil, he moved to the United States in the early 1970s and worked with Brazilian bandleader Sérgio Mendes. He went on to perform with many American pop, rock and jazz musicians and participated in thousands of albums. DownBeat magazine call him "one of the most talented percussionists of our time." He played on such albums as Earth, Wind & Fire's I Am, Michael Jackson's Thriller, Madonna's True Blue, Celine Dion's Let's Talk About Love, hit singles and movie soundtracks, including Saturday Night Fever, Dirty Dancing and Purple Rain among others. He has also toured with Diana Krall. He plays over 200 instruments professionally, and has worked in a variety of music genres including Brazilian, blues, Christian, country, disco, gospel, hip hop, jazz, Latin, pop, rhythm and blues, rock, soul, and world music. He was signed to Norman Granz's Pablo Records for three of his solo albums, Agora, Happy People and Sunrise, as well as Breakdown. Da Costa received the National Academy of Recording Arts and Sciences' Most Valuable Player Award for three consecutive years. He also received the Musicians Emeritus Award.

Early life and career 
Da Costa was born in Irajá, a neighborhood in the city of Rio de Janeiro, Brazil, and as a child began learning the pandeiro. He began performing in the samba parades in Rio de Janeiro and later joined the youth wing of Portela's Bateria, the rhythm section of a samba school. He became one of the most internationally known percussionists to emerge from the Samba Schools of Brazil (Escola de Samba). As a teen, da Costa traveled extensively with samba trios and quartets, Brazilian ensembles and Carnaval orchestras. His association with these groups offered him the opportunity to participate in music festivals around the world, in a troupe led by Jorge Goulart and Nora Ney.

Da Costa further developed his musical ability after being exposed to jazz and Cuban music and expanded the range of percussion instruments he could play. He later toured Europe and the Middle East with a Brazilian ensemble together with Waldir Maia e Alcione in 1970. In 1972, Paulinho participated in the Festival International da Canção in the Maracanãzinho, performing the song Fio Maravilha, written about the soccer player Fio Maravilha, with Maria Alcina.

In 1972, da Costa moved to Los Angeles and played with Sergio Mendes from 1973 until 1976. He was introduced to Norman Granz by Dizzy Gillespie and was signed to Granz' label, Pablo Records. Da Costa's association with Granz and Pablo Records made it possible for him to receive permanent resident status in the US. Da Costa went on to record three solo albums under Pablo Records.

While in Los Angeles, Da Costa also worked with other artists and gained notoriety. The first album he recorded in Los Angeles was with a group called the Miracles. He played on their number one charting song, "Love Machine", in 1975. Da Costa coproduced Ella Abraça Jobim with Ella Fitzgerald. He also worked extensively with Dizzy Gillespie, Joe Pass, and Milt Jackson. Moreover, Da Costa ventured into a variety of genres and recorded with artists such as Earth, Wind and Fire, Donna Summer, Tavares, Michael Jackson, Madonna, Rod Stewart, Lionel Richie, Gloria Gaynor, and others.

Da Costa toured with his band and performed at Montreux Jazz Festival in 1977.

Session work 
The All Music Guide to Jazz: The Definitive Guide to Jazz Music describes da Costa as one of the most in-demand session musicians in Los Angeles studios since the 1970s. He's worked with more than 900 musical artists and bands, performing on over 200 drums, bells, whistles and other instruments. He played on Dizzy Gillespie's albums including Free Ride, Dizzy's Party and Bahiana. He collaborated on producer and visionary Maurice White and Earth, Wind and Fire's albums, All 'N All, I Am, Faces, Raise!, Powerlight, Millennium and In the Name of Love. Producer Quincy Jones chose da Costa to work on many projects, including the soundtracks for The Wiz and The Color Purple, as well as Jones's albums The Dude, Basie & Beyond, Back on the Block, Q's Jook Joint and From Q with Love. Da Costa was a regular on the albums Jones produced, including The Brothers Johnson's Light Up the Night, George Benson's Give Me the Night, Donna Summer's Donna Summer, Barbra Streisand's Till I Loved You and USA for Africa's We Are the World. Michael Jackson called on da Costa for Off the Wall, Thriller, Bad, Dangerous, HIStory: Past, Present and Future, Book I and Invincible. Da Costa also left his mark on the film industry by contributing to various film scores such as Ally McBeal, Flashdance, Footloose, Selena, Sex and the City, and more.

Instruments 
According to his website, da Costa has played agogô, atabaque, bar chimes, bass drum, batá drum, bell tree, berimbau, bongos, bougarabou, cabasa, cajón, castanets, caxixi, chimes, chocalho, claves, conga, cowbell, cuíca, cymbal, djembe, finger cymbals, flexatone, ganzá, gong, guiro, jawbone, kokiriko, kora, log drums, maraca, pandeiro, rainstick, reco-reco, repinique, samba whistle, shekere, slapstick, snare drum, spoon, surdo, talking drum, tambora, tamborim, tambourine, tan-tan, temple block, timbau, timbales, kettle drum, triangle, udu, vibraslap, whistle, woodblock, and zabumba.

He has also played dumbek, sleigh bells, African shakers, and zurna.

Performances 
 1973–1976 – Sergio Mendes & Brasil '77
 1977 – Montreux Jazz Festival (with da Costa's band)
 1984 – Playboy Jazz Festival (with the Yellow Jackets) 
 1987 – The 1st Annual Soul Train Music Awards (with George Duke, David Sanborn, George Benson)
 1988 – Rosemary Clooney "Singers' Salute to the Songwriters" Dorothy Chandler Pavilion
 1990 – Lee Ritenour and Friends – Live from the Cocoanut Grove
 1990 – Rainforest Foundation Benefit Performance at Ted Child's House (Sting, Paul Simon, Don Henley, Bruce Springsteen, Bruce Hornsby, Herbie Hancock, Branford Marsalis)
 1990 – Nelson Mandela – An International Tribute for a Free South Africa
 1992 – Music Center, Dorothy Chandler Pavilion, (Lalo Shifrin Conductor)
 1993 – Montreux Jazz Festival (George Duke, Al Jarreau)
 1994 – The Kennedy Center Concert of the Americas with Quincy Jones part of the Hemispheric Summit for all the Presidents of the Americas, 34 Countries, 150 performers
 1995 – A Tribute to Tom Jobim, Avery Fisher Hall, Lincoln Center ( Lee Ritenour, Joao Gilberto, Caetano Veloso)
 1996 – Lalo Schifrin Big Band Schifrin's tribute to Dizzy Gillespie – "The Gillespiana Suite"
 1997 – Songs And Visions Concert, Wembley Stadium (Tony Hollingsworth, Stewart Levine, Rod Stewart, Jon Bon Jovi Seal Mary J. Blige )
 2001 – Eric Clapton Tour
 2001 – Diana Krall, Live in Paris, Olympia
 2006 – JC Penney Jam Concert For America's Kids (Dr. Phil, David Foster)
 2008 – Montreux Jazz Festival (Quincy's 75th Anniversary)
 2008 – Diana Krall Live in Rio
 2010 – Montreux Jazz Festival (Quincy Jones & The Global Gumbo All-Stars)
 2010 – Herbie Hancock's Seven Decades at the Hollywood Bowl
 2012 – Mawazine Rhythms of the World Festival in Rabat, Morocco
 2013 – Power of Love Gala, Cleveland Clinic Lou Ruvo Center, MGM (Stevie Wonder, Jennifer Hudson, Chaka Khan, Bono, ChrisTucker, Amy Poehler, Arsenio Hall, Whoopi Goldberg)

Discography 
 Agora (Pablo, 1977)
 Tudo Bem! (with Joe Pass) (Pablo, 1978)
 Happy People (Pablo, 1979)
 Paulinho da Costa (Globo, 1984)
 Sunrise (Pablo, 1984)
 Breakdown (A&M, 1991)

References

External links 
 
 
 Drummerworld.com: Paulinho da Costa

1948 births
Living people
Musicians from Rio de Janeiro (city)
20th-century Brazilian musicians
20th-century drummers
21st-century Brazilian musicians
21st-century drummers
A&M Records artists
Bass drum players
Batá drummers
Bongo players
Brazilian drummers
Brazilian expatriates in the United States
Brazilian jazz percussionists
Brazilian percussionists
Brazilian session musicians
Castanets players
Conga players
Djembe players
Güira players
Güiro players
Latin jazz percussionists
Maracas players
R&B percussionists
Snare drummers
Tambourine players
Timbaleros
Timpanists
Triangle players